Barkha Sharma is an Indian fashion designer and creator of a men's line labeled Barkha 'n' Sonzal, along with her sister. In 2014, she was nominated for the International Woolmark Prize in the menswear category to represent India. Barkha, under the label Rhydhun, also designs handicrafts. Barkha Sharma is also a trained dancer and tanpura player who was invited to perform with her husband Rahul Sharma for Prince William and Kate Middleton at the Hyderabad House, in the presence of the Prime Minister of India Narendra Modi in April 2016.

Career

Fashion Design

Barkha launched her fashion brand in 2009, along with her sister, with a men's collection called "Dance of the Warrior". In 2010, they styled Pandit Shivkumar Sharma and Rahul Sharma for the song Mile Sur Mera Tumhara.

The sister duo has also designed – The Yogi, Rebel, Spirituale, Wah Taj Tea Ad, Tata Ad shot in Kashmir. She also designed the music album cover for Namaste India, an album by Rahul Sharma along with the music video "Meeting by the Nile". Barkha's label is the first to design a sherwani made of string beans, purple cabbage and green peas for PETA India.

Barkha has worked with various tribes of India, South Africa, Europe, Egypt, Russia etc. She also volunteered for various NGOs, one of them being Aseema for which she designed jackets for the winners of the rickshaw challenge in 2009, the benefits of which were donated to charity.

Music & Art

Barkhas has also lent her voice to Rahul Sharma's album "Spirituale," reciting Rumi's poems. She is also featured as a model with her husband in Richard Clayderman's music video from the album Confluence 2. She also conceptualised a fashion film featuring Terrence Lewis which was selected to be shown as part of the Fashion Films Premiere at Lakmé Fashion Week Winter/ Festive 2013.

Barkha played tanpura with her husband Rahul Sharma for the President of India Ram Nath Kovind, Chief Minister of Maharashtra Devendra Fadnavis, Hansa Yogendra ji, Governor of Maharastra Vidyasagar Rao and other dignitaries for the 100 years completion of the Yoga Institute. For Yoga International Day, Barkha danced to a song called "Yug O' Vision", composed by Rahul Sharma, sung by Siddharth Basrur, under the guidance of Hansa Yogendra ji of the oldest Yoga Institute Santacruz, in Asia. It was choreographed by Padmabhushan Padma Subrahmanyam.

Personal life 

Barkha Sharma was born and brought up in Mumbai and later moved to the United States to pursue higher studies as a BSc graduate from Purdue University. She has also completed a marketing program at The Wharton Business School. Barkha's father is a Gujarati and her mother hails from the Kashmiri Pandit origin. She is married to Rahul Sharma and they have a son, Abhinav. Barkha is also a classical dancer trained in Mohiniattam and other dance forms. She studied Kalaripayattu at CVN Karlari.

References

External links 
 

Indian women fashion designers
Living people
Indian businesspeople in fashion
Artists from Mumbai
Purdue University alumni
Year of birth missing (living people)
Wharton School of the University of Pennsylvania alumni